The Ministry of Internal Affairs of the USSR (MVD) was the interior ministry of the Soviet Union from 1946 to 1991. 

The MVD was established as the successor to the NKVD during reform of the People's Commissariats into the Ministries of the Soviet Union in 1946. The MVD did not include agencies concerned with secret policing unlike the NKVD, with the function being assigned to the Ministry of State Security (MGB). The MVD and MGB were briefly merged into a single ministry from March 1953 until the MGB was split off as the Committee for State Security (KGB) in March 1954. The MVD was headed by the Minister of Interior and responsible for many internal services in the Soviet Union such as law enforcement and prisons, the Internal Troops, Traffic Safety, the Gulag system, and the internal migration system. The MVD was dissolved upon the dissolution of the Soviet Union in December 1991 and succeeded by its branches in the Post-Soviet states.

History 

The Ministry of Internal Affairs of the USSR was created on 15 March 1946 from the People's Commissariat for Internal Affairs (NKVD), the interior ministry of the Soviet Union since 1934, when all the People's Commissariats (the Soviet equivalent to a government ministry) were rebranded and transformed into the Ministries of the Soviet Union. The main change was the removal of secret police functions, as the responsibilities of the Main Directorate of State Security of the NKVD were transferred to the new Ministry of State Security (MGB) as a completely separate ministry.

On 15 March 1953, the MGB was incorporated into the MVD, re-creating a structure similar to the NKVD, but just under a year later on 13 March 1954 the MGB's functions were again transferred to a separate state committee, the Committee for State Security (KGB). 

The MVD was originally established as a union-republic ministry with headquarters in Moscow, but in 1960 the Soviet leadership under Nikita Khrushchev, as part of its general downgrading of the police, abolished the central MVD, whose functions were assumed by republic ministries of internal affairs. In 1962 the MVD was re-designated the Ministry for the Preservation of Public Order (Ministerstvo okhrany obshchestvennogo poriadka — MOOP). This name change implied a break with the all-powerful MVD created by Lavrentiy Beria, as well as a narrower range of functions. The changes were accompanied by increasing criticism of the regular police, the militsiya, in the Soviet press for its shortcomings in combating crime.

Following Khrushchev's ouster in 1964, his successor Leonid Brezhnev did much to raise the status of the regular police. In 1966, after placing one of his proteges, Nikolai Shchelokov, in the post of chief, Brezhnev reinstated MOOP as a union-republic ministry. Two years later, MOOP was renamed the MVD, an apparent symbol of its increased authority. Efforts were made to raise the effectiveness of the MVD by recruiting better-qualified personnel and upgrading equipment and training. Brezhnev's death in 1982, however, left the MVD vulnerable to his opponents, Yuri Andropov in particular. Just a month after Brezhnev died, Shchelokov was ousted as its chief and replaced by the former KGB chairman, Vitaly Fedorchuk. Shchelokov was later tried on corruption charges. A similar fate befell Brezhnev's son-in-law, Yuri Churbanov, who was removed from the post of first deputy chief in 1984 and later arrested on criminal charges. After bringing several officials from the KGB and from the CPSU apparatus into the MVD, Andropov sought to make it an effective organization for rooting out widespread corruption; Mikhail Gorbachev continued these efforts.

In January 1986, when Fedorchuk was retired, Aleksandr Vlasov was appointed the chief of the MVD despite having no background in the police apparatus. In September 1988, Vlasov became a candidate member of the CPSU Politburo, and the following month he was replaced as chief of the MVD by Vadim Bakatin.

Interior minister Boris Pugo was one of the main organizers of the 1991 Soviet coup d'état attempt, and when the coup failed, he killed himself. Pugo was replaced by Viktor Barannikov, who acted as the final interior minister of the Soviet Union. The MVD was effectively dissolved upon the dissolution of the Soviet Union on 26 December 1991, though its branches in the various Soviet republics have survived as the interior ministries of the now-independent Post-Soviet states.

Functions and organization 
The MVD had a wide array of duties related to the internal functions and security of the Soviet Union. It was responsible for uncovering and investigating certain categories of crime, apprehending criminals, supervising the internal passport system, maintaining public order, combating public intoxication, supervising parolees, managing prisons and labor camps, providing fire protection, and controlling traffic. Until early 1988, the MVD was also in charge of special psychiatric hospitals, but a law passed in January 1988 transferred all psychiatric hospitals to the authority of the Ministry of Health.

Internal security 
As a union-republic ministry under the Council of Ministers, the MVD had its headquarters in Moscow and branches in the republic and regional government apparatus, as well as in oblasts and cities. Unlike the KGB, the internal affairs apparatus was subject to dual subordination: local internal-affairs offices reported both to the executive committees of their respective local Soviets and to their superior offices in the MVD hierarchy.

The MVD headquarters in Moscow was divided into several directorates and offices:

 The Directorate for Combating the Embezzlement of Socialist Property and Speculation controled such white-collar crime as embezzlement and falsification of economic-plan records.
 The Criminal Investigation Directorate assisted the Procuracy, and on occasion the KGB, in the investigation of criminal cases.
 There was a separate department for investigating and prosecuting minor cases, such as traffic violations
 The Maintenance of Public Order Directorate was responsible for ensuring order in public places and for preventing outbreaks of public unrest.
 Fire Protection Directorate
 Directorate of Milita. The members of the militsiya (uniformed police), as part of the regular police force, were distinguished by their gray uniforms with red piping. The duties of the militsiya included patrolling public places to ensure order and arresting persons who violated the law, including vagrants and drunks. Resisting arrest or preventing a police officer from executing his duties was a serious crime in the Soviet Union, punishable by one to five years' imprisonment. Killing a policeman was punishable by death.
 Internal Troops Directorate - administered troops organized, equipped, and trained as military forces but assigned to the Ministry of Internal Affairs 
 The Office of Visas and Registration was charged with registering Soviet citizens and foreigners residing in each precinct of a city and with issuing internal passports to Soviet citizens. Soviet citizens wishing to emigrate from the Soviet Union and foreigners wishing to travel within the Soviet Union had to obtain visas from this office.
 The Office of Recruitment and Training supervised the recruitment of new members of the militsiya, who were recommended by work collectives and public organizations. The local party and Komsomol bodies screened candidates thoroughly to ensure their political reliability. Individuals serving in the militsiya were exempt from the regular military draft.
 Office of Motor Vehicle Inspection

Educational institutions under the MVD
Novosibirsk Higher Military Command School of the Internal Troops
Ordzhonikidze Higher Military Command School of the Internal Troops named after Sergey Kirov
Perm Higher Military Command School of the Internal Troops
Saratov Higher Military Command School of the Internal Troops named after Felix Dzerzhinsky
Kharkov Higher Military School of Logistics of the Internal Troops 
Leningrad Higher Political-School of Internal Troops named after the 60th anniversary of the Komsomol

List of ministers

Source:
 Sergei Kruglov (14 January 1946 – 13 March 1953)
 Lavrentiy Beria (13 March 1953 – 26 July 1953)
 Sergei Kruglov (10 July 1953 – 1 February 1956)
 Nikolai Dudorov (1 February 1956 – 13 January 1960)
 Nikolai Shchelokov (17 September 1966 – 17 December 1982)
 Vitaly Fedorchuk (17 December 1982 – 25 January 1986)
 Aleksandr Vlasov (25 January 1986 – 20 October 1988)
 Vadim Bakatin (20 October 1988 – 2 December 1990)
 Boris Pugo (2 December 1990 – 22 August 1991)
 Viktor Barannikov (23 August 1991 – 19 December 1991)

References

Further reading

 Nation, R. C. (2018). Black Earth, Red Star: A History of Soviet Security Policy, 1917-1991. Ithaca, NY: Cornell University Press.
 
 

Internal Affairs
Soviet Union